Simone Basso (born 25 July 1982) is an Italian football forward who currently plays for Lavagnese.

He previously played for Parma F.C., Livorno Calcio, A.C. Prato, Aglianese Calcio 1923, U.S.D. Lavagnese 1919, Sangiovannese, F.C. Crotone, Frosinone Calcio, Spezia Calcio and Sorrento Calcio

Domestic League Records

External links
AIC profile

1982 births
Living people
Italian footballers
Parma Calcio 1913 players
U.S. Livorno 1915 players
A.C. Prato players
F.C. Crotone players
Spezia Calcio players
Frosinone Calcio players
A.S.D. Sorrento players
Trapani Calcio players
Venezia F.C. players
Modena F.C. players
Serie B players
People from Chiavari
Association football forwards
Sportspeople from the Province of Genoa
Footballers from Liguria